Several ships of the Royal Navy were named Negro

 , ex-Niger (1759), a 
 , an 
  (FY 717), a minesweeping naval trawler

Royal Navy ship names